The cylindrical lanternshark or Carter Gilbert's lanternshark (Etmopterus carteri) is a shark of the family Etmopteridae found along the Caribbean coast of Colombia in South America, at depths of between 285 and 355 m.  Its maximum length is 21 cm.

Reproduction is presumed to be ovoviviparous, with three to 20 pups of 10 – 20 cm in length per litter.

Etymology
The shark is named in honor of Carter R. Gilbert (1930-2022), of the Florida Museum of Natural History, because of his 1967 revision of the hammerhead sharks.

References

 
 Compagno, Dando, & Fowler, Sharks of the World, Princeton University Press, New Jersey 2005 

Etmopterus
Taxa named by Stewart Springer
Taxa named by George H. Burgess
Fish described in 1985